Mi amor frente al pasado is a Mexican telenovela directed by Carlos S. Zuñiga for Televisa in 1979.

Cast 
Blanca Sánchez
Arturo Beristáin
Martha Navarro
Roberto Cañedo
Rita Macedo
Lili Inclán
Alma Delfina

References

External links 

Mexican telenovelas
1979 telenovelas
Televisa telenovelas
Spanish-language telenovelas
1979 Mexican television series debuts
1979 Mexican television series endings